Stephen Russ (born 29 April 1955) is a former Australian rules footballer who played with South Melbourne in the Victorian Football League (VFL).

Notes

External links 

Living people
1955 births
Australian rules footballers from Victoria (Australia)
Sydney Swans players
Ormond Amateur Football Club players